This is a list of municipalities in Brazil which have standing links to local communities in other countries. In most cases, the association, especially when formalised by local government, is known as "town twinning" (usually in Europe) or "sister cities" (usually in the rest of the world).

A
Aquiraz

 Frederick, United States
 São Vicente, Cape Verde

Araçariguama
 Binhu (Wuxi), China

Assis Chateaubriand
 Seixal, Portugal

B
Balneário Camboriú

 Pingdingshan, China
 Punta del Este, Uruguay

Barra Mansa 
 Bengbu, China

Barueri
 Ourém, Portugal

Belém

 Aveiro, Portugal
 Campinas, Brazil
 Fort-de-France, Martinique, France
 Shaoxing, China

Belmonte
 Belmonte, Portugal

Belo Horizonte

 Cuenca, Ecuador
 Fort Lauderdale, United States
 Granada, Spain
 Havana, Cuba
 Homs, Syria
 Jiangyin, China
 Lagos, Nigeria
 Luanda, Angola
 Masaya, Nicaragua
 Newark, United States
 Tripoli, Libya
 Tegucigalpa, Honduras
 Zahlé, Lebanon

Bento Gonçalves

 Brentonico, Italy
 Cartaxo, Portugal
 Isera, Italy
 Luján de Cuyo, Argentina
 Mori, Italy
 Nogaredo, Italy
 Rovereto, Italy
 Terragnolo, Italy
 Trambileno, Italy
 Villa Lagarina, Italy

Blumenau

 Campinas, Brazil
 Osorno, Chile
 Petrópolis, Brazil

Bragança Paulista
 Bragança, Portugal

Brasília

 Asunción, Paraguay
 Buenos Aires, Argentina
 Gaza City, Palestine
 Havana, Cuba
 Khartoum, Sudan
 Kyiv, Ukraine
 Luxor, Egypt
 Montevideo, Uruguay
 Tehran, Iran
 Xi'an, China

C
Cabedelo
 Viana do Castelo, Portugal

Cabo Frio

 Huzhou, China
 Ílhavo, Portugal

Campinas

 Asunción, Paraguay
 Auroville, India
 Belém, Brazil
 Blumenau, Brazil
 Cabinda, Angola
 Camanducaia, Brazil
 Cascais, Portugal
 Concepción, Chile
 Córdoba, Argentina
 Cotorro (Havana), Cuba
 Daloa, Ivory Coast

 Fuzhou, China
 Gifu, Japan
 Indianapolis, United States
 Jericho, Palestine
 Malito, Italy

 Peruíbe, Brazil
 Salinas, Brazil
 San Diego, United States
 Ubatuba, Brazil
 Viseu, Portugal
 Zaragoza, Spain

Campo Grande
 Puerto Tirol, Argentina

Canoas

 Morón, Argentina
 Quilmes, Argentina

Canoinhas
 Sterling, United States

Cantanhede
 Cantanhede, Portugal

Caxias do Sul

 Changzhou, China
 Little Rock, United States

Chapecó

 Asunción, Paraguay
 Medellín, Colombia
 Ninghai, China
 Pergamino, Argentina

Colombo
 Heze, China

Congonhas
 Matosinhos, Portugal

Criciúma

 Huaibei, China
 Vittorio Veneto, Italy

Cubatão

 Águas de São Pedro, Brazil
 Aveiro, Portugal
 Conchal, Brazil
 Melipilla, Chile
 Peruíbe, Brazil
 Serra Negra, Brazil
 Taquaritinga, Brazil

Curitiba

 Asunción, Paraguay
 Changzhou, China
 Coimbra, Portugal
 Columbus, United States
 Guadalajara, Mexico
 Hangzhou, China
 Himeji, Japan
 Jacksonville, United States
 Kraków, Poland
 Miami-Dade County, United States
 Montevideo, Uruguay
 Orlando, United States
 Santa Cruz de la Sierra, Bolivia
 Suwon, South Korea
 Treviso Province, Italy

D
Diamantina
 Daytona Beach, United States

Dourados

 Iquique, Chile
 Kearney, United States

E
Embu das Artes
 Hino, Japan

F
Farroupilha

 Cadaval, Portugal
 Latina, Italy

Florianópolis

 Angra do Heroísmo, Portugal
 Asunción, Paraguay
 Córdoba, Argentina
 Fernando de la Mora, Paraguay
 Havana, Cuba
 Luján, Argentina
 Ponta Delgada, Portugal
 Praia da Vitória, Portugal
 Presidente Franco, Paraguay
 Roanoke, United States

Fortaleza

 Ferreira do Alentejo, Portugal
 Lisbon, Portugal
 Miami Beach, United States
 Montese, Italy
 Natal, Brazil
 Praia, Cape Verde
 Sal, Cape Verde

Foz do Iguaçu

 Hernandarias, Paraguay
 Jerez de la Frontera, Spain
 Jericho, Palestine
 Yichang, China

Franco da Rocha
 Stepanakert, Azerbaijan

G
Goiânia

 Chittagong, Bangladesh
 Uberaba, Brazil
 Xinzhou, China

Gramado

 Angra do Heroísmo, Portugal
 Levico Terme, Italy
 Maldonado, Uruguay
 Óbidos, Portugal
 Puerto Varas, Chile

Guarapuava
 Rastatt, Germany

Guararapes
 Natori, Japan

Guarujá
 Cascais, Portugal

Guarulhos

 Avellaneda, Argentina
 Boyeros (Havana), Cuba
 Cuenca, Ecuador
 Ecatepec, Mexico
 Maputo, Mozambique

 Mejicanos, El Salvador
 Quito, Ecuador

I
Igarassu

 Viana do Alentejo, Portugal
 Viana do Castelo, Portugal

Ilhéus
 Davenport, United States

Itajaí

 Melipilla, Chile
 Pompano Beach, United States
 Sodegaura, Japan
 Viana do Castelo, Portugal
 Xinxiang, China

Itanhaém
 Marbella, Spain

Iúna
 Castelluccio Superiore, Italy

J
Jandira
 Kameoka, Japan

Joinville

 Chesapeake, United States
 Joinville-le-Pont, France

 Schaffhausen, Switzerland
 Spišská Nová Ves, Slovakia
 Zhengzhou, China

Jundiaí

 Havana, Cuba 
 Iwakuni, Japan

 Rugao, China
 Tai'an, China
 Trenton, United States

L
Londrina

 Guimarães, Portugal
 Modena, Italy
 León, Nicaragua
 Nago, Japan

 Toledo, United States
 Zhenjiang, China

M
Macapá
 Kourou, French Guiana, France

Mairiporã
 Stepanakert, Azerbaijan

Manaus
 Braga, Portugal

Marília
 Higashihiroshima, Japan

Maringá

 Caserta, Italy
 General San Martín, Argentina
 Kakogawa, Japan
 Leiria, Portugal

Mogi das Cruzes

 Seki, Japan
 Tournai, Belgium
 Toyama, Japan

Mostardas
 Aprilia, Italy

N
Natal

 Bethlehem, Palestine
 Córdoba, Argentina
 Fortaleza, Brazil
 Guadalajara, Mexico

 Porto Alegre, Brazil

Niterói

 Jerusalem, Israel
 São Gonçalo, Brazil

Nova Friburgo
 Santo Tirso, Portugal

Nova Odessa
 Jelgava, Latvia

Nova Petrópolis
 Sunchales, Argentina

Nova Prata

 Cittadella, Italy
 Noblesville, United States

Novo Hamburgo

 Atlántida, Uruguay
 Canelones, Uruguay
 Elda, Spain
 León, Mexico
 São João da Madeira, Portugal

O
Oeiras
 Oeiras, Portugal

Olímpia
 Belmonte, Portugal

Olinda

 Colonia del Sacramento, Uruguay
 Vila do Conde, Portugal

Osasco

 Gyumri, Armenia
 Jining, China
 Osasco, Italy
 Tsu, Japan
 Viana, Angola
 Xuzhou, China

Ouro Preto
 Belmonte, Portugal

P
Paraíso do Tocantins
 Tarouca, Portugal

Paraty

 Capri, Italy
 Cunha, Brazil
 Ílhavo, Portugal

Pelotas

 Aracati, Brazil
 Aveiro, Portugal
 Colonia del Sacramento, Uruguay
 Suzu, Japan

Petrolina
 Castelo Branco, Portugal

Petrópolis

 Areal, Brazil
 Blumenau, Brazil
 Orleans, Brazil
 Sintra, Portugal

Piracicaba

 Amadora, Portugal
 Seongnam, South Korea

Poços de Caldas
 Caldas da Rainha, Portugal

Pomerode
 Torgelow, Germany

Porto Alegre

 Horta, Portugal
 Kanazawa, Japan
 Morano Calabro, Italy
 Natal, Brazil
 Newark, United States
 La Plata, Argentina
 Punta del Este, Uruguay
 Portalegre, Portugal
 Ribeira Grande, Portugal
 Rosario, Argentina
 Suzhou, China
 Tampa, United States

Porto Seguro

 Belmonte, Portugal
 Fafe, Portugal
 Setúbal, Portugal
 Trancoso, Portugal
 Viana do Alentejo, Portugal
 Viana do Castelo, Portugal

Porto Velho
 Jinan, China

Promissão
 Silistra, Bulgaria

Prudentópolis
 Ternopil, Ukraine

Q
Queimados
 Jiujiang, China

R
Recife

 Chengdu, China
 Guangzhou, China

 Porto, Portugal

Registro
 Nakatsugawa, Japan

Ribeirão Preto

 Bucaramanga, Colombia
 San Leandro, United States
 Teramo, Italy

Rio de Janeiro

 Arganil, Portugal
 Athens, Greece
 Atlanta, United States
 Baku, Azerbaijan
 Barcelona, Spain
 Barranquilla, Colombia
 Beijing, China
 Beirut, Lebanon
 Braga, Portugal
 Buenos Aires, Argentina
 Busan, South Korea
 Cape Town, South Africa
 Caracas, Venezuela
 Cologne, Germany
 A Coruña, Spain
 Cusco, Peru
 Espinho, Portugal
 Guimarães, Portugal
 Guiyang, China
 Havana, Cuba
 Hebron, Palestine
 Istanbul, Turkey
 Jerusalem, Israel
 Kyiv, Ukraine
 Kobe, Japan
 Lahore, Pakistan
 Lisbon, Portugal
 Liverpool, England, United Kingdom
 Madrid, Spain
 Managua, Nicaragua
 Maputo, Mozambique
 Mar del Plata, Argentina
 Montevideo, Uruguay
 Montpellier, France
 Montreal, Canada
 Newark, United States
 Nice, France
 Oklahoma City, United States
 Olhão, Portugal
 Parelhas, Brazil
 La Paz, Bolivia
 Praia, Cape Verde
 Ra'anana, Israel
 Ramat Gan, Israel
 Rufisque, Senegal
 Saint Petersburg, Russia
 Samarkand, Uzbekistan
 San José, Costa Rica
 Santa Cruz de Tenerife, Spain
 Santo Domingo, Dominican Republic
 São Borja, Brazil
 Tianjin, China
 Tunis, Tunisia
 Viana do Castelo, Portugal
 Vila Nova de Gaia, Portugal
 Viseu, Portugal
 Warsaw, Poland

S
Salvador

 Angra do Heroísmo, Portugal
 Campobasso, Italy
 Florence, Italy
 Harbin, China
 Havana, Cuba
 Ifẹ, Nigeria
 Jerusalem, Israel
 Kingston, Jamaica
 Lisbon, Portugal
 Los Angeles, United States
 Luanda, Angola
 Pontevedra, Spain
 Sciacca, Italy
 Valparaíso, Chile

Santa Bárbara
 Jericho, Palestine

Santa Cruz Cabrália

 Belmonte, Portugal
 Felgueiras, Portugal
 Manteigas, Portugal

Santa Gertrudes
 Novellara, Italy

Santarém
 Santarém, Portugal

Santo André

 Ribeira Brava, Cape Verde
 Takasaki, Japan

Santos

 Alajuela, Costa Rica
 Ansião, Portugal
 Arouca, Portugal
 Cádiz, Spain
 Callao, Peru
 Coimbra, Portugal
 Colón, Panama
 Constanța, Romania
 Fernando de la Mora, Paraguay
 Funchal, Portugal
 Havana, Cuba
 Kenitra, Morocco
 Nagasaki, Japan
 Ningbo, China
 Porto, Portugal
 Rizhao, China
 Shimonoseki, Japan

 Trieste, Italy
 Ulsan, South Korea
 Ushuaia, Argentina
 Veracruz, Mexico
 Viseu, Portugal

São Bernardo do Campo

 General San Martín, Argentina
 Havana, Cuba
 Managua, Nicaragua
 Marostica, Italy
 Shūnan, Japan
 Vittorio Veneto, Italy

São João Nepomuceno
 Nepomuk, Czech Republic

São José do Belmonte
 Belmonte, Portugal

São José dos Campos
 Kadoma, Japan

São José dos Pinhais

 Montemor-o-Velho, Portugal
 Zibo, China

São Luís
 Nairobi, Kenya

São Mateus
 Sondrio, Italy

São Paulo

 Abidjan, Ivory Coast
 Asunción, Paraguay
 Barcelona, Spain
 Belmonte, Portugal

 Cluj-Napoca, Romania
 Havana, Cuba
 İzmir, Turkey
 Lima, Peru

 Macau, China
 Miami-Dade County, United States
 Milan, Italy

 Osaka, Japan
 La Paz, Bolivia

 San Cristóbal de La Laguna, Spain
 Santiago, Chile
 Santiago de Compostela, Spain
 Seoul, South Korea
 Shanghai, China
 Yerevan, Armenia

São Sebastião
 Fort Lauderdale, United States

São Vicente

 Ansião, Portugal
 Asunción, Paraguay
 Belmonte, Portugal
 Corrientes, Argentina
 Havana, Cuba
 Holguín, Cuba
 Naha, Japan
 Resistencia, Argentina
 Santarém, Portugal
 Vila Viçosa, Portugal

Sorocaba

 Anyang, South Korea
 Nanchang, China
 Wuxi, China

Suzano
 Komatsu, Japan

U
Uberaba

 Goiânia, Brazil
 Hyderabad, India
 Ongole, India
 Reynosa, Mexico

Umuarama
 Castelo Branco, Portugal

Urussanga
 Longarone, Italy

V
Viana

 Viana do Alentejo, Portugal
 Viana do Castelo, Portugal

Vila Velha
 Qingdao, China

Vinhedo
 Bozhou, China

Vitória

 Cascais, Portugal
 Iquique, Chile
 Zhuhai, China

References

Brazil
Municipalities of Brazil
Brazil geography-related lists
Foreign relations of Brazil
Populated places in Brazil